Elections to Stockport Metropolitan Borough Council took place on 22 May 2014. They coincided with other local elections happening on this day across the UK, as well as the 2014 elections to the European Parliament.

Stockport Council is elected in thirds which means that in each three member local ward, one councillor is elected every year, except every four years which is classed as fallow year. The previous fallow year was 2013, when no local government elections took place in the borough.

Following the elections, the Lib Dem minority run administration was able to continue in office.

State of the Parties 
Going into the election the Liberal Democrats hold 29 seats, the Labour Party on 21, The Conservatives on 10 and the Heald Green Independent Rate Payers holding 3. 
Following the election the state of the Parties is as follows: Liberal Democrats: 28, Labour: 22, Conservatives: 10, Heald Green Rate Payers: 3. 

In the 2014 election 7 parties contested seats throughout the borough and gained the following vote shares:

In the 2014/15 year there were several defections. Three from Labour to sit as Independents, and one from the Conservatives to UKIP.

Election results by ward 
Asterix indicates incumbent in the ward, and bold names highlight winning candidate.

Bramhall North

Bramhall South & Woodford 

Bramhall South & Woodford saw a By-Election in the ward in November 2014 due to the resignation of the incumbent Conservative councillor. The Conservatives held the seat.

Bredbury & Woodley

Bredbury Green & Romiley 
Mags Kirkham left the Lib Dems in April 2016 to become an Independent politician.

Brinnington & Central

Cheadle & Gatley

Cheadle Hulme North

Cheadle Hulme South 
Stuart Bodsworth defected to the Labour Party on the night of the 2016 local election.

Davenport & Cale Green

Edgeley & Cheadle Heath

Hazel Grove

Heald Green

Heatons North

Heatons South

Manor

Marple North

Marple South

Offerton

Reddish North

Reddish South

Stepping Hill

Changes since this election

Bramhall South & Woodford

References

External links
Stockport Council

2014
2014 English local elections
2010s in Greater Manchester